Harry S. "Harvey" Hester was an American football player and coach. He served as the head football coach at Wofford College in 1915. Hester was a standout player at the University of Florida, once scoring seven touchdowns in one game against Florida Southern College in 1913.

Head coaching record

References

Year of birth missing
Year of death missing
American football quarterbacks
American football halfbacks
Florida Gators football players
Wofford Terriers football coaches